Athletic taping is the process of applying tape directly to the skin or over pre-wrap in order to maintain a stable position of bones and muscles during athletic activity. It is a procedure that uses athletic tape (pressure-sensitive tape similar to surgical tape or elastic therapeutic tape), attached to the skin, to physically hold muscles or bones at a certain position. This reduces pain and aids recovery. Taping is usually used to help recover from overuse and other injuries.

The general goals of athletic taping are to restrict the motion of an injured joint, in order to add stability for a temporary period of time. It compresses soft tissues to reduce swelling, support anatomical structures involved in the injury, serve as a splint or secure a splint, secure dressing or bandages, protect the injured joint from re-injury, and protect the injured part while the injured part is in the healing process.

Role of taping
Taping has many roles such as to support the ligaments and capsules of unstable joints by limiting excessive or abnormal anatomical movement. Taping also enhances proprioceptive feedback from the limb or joint. Finally, taping can support injuries at the muscle-tendon units by compressing and limiting movement and secure protective pads, dressings and splints.

Advantages

Injury Prevention: Athletic taping is recognized as one of the top preventative measures for reduction of injuries in collision sports. These injuries often occur as a result of extrinsic factors such as collision with other players or equipment. Athletic taping has also been shown to reduce the severity in injuries, as well as the occurrence of injury in most sports, this is especially helpful for people who are prone to certain injuries.

Injury Management: Tape is often applied to manage symptoms of chronic injuries such as medial tibial stress syndrome (or shin splints), patella-femoral syndrome, and turf toe. Athletic tape can be applied to ease pain symptoms as well. Taping along the nerve tract of irritated or inflamed tissue can shorten the inflamed region and reduce pain. There is limited evidence of Kinesio taping benefit as a complementary therapy in shoulder-pain syndromes.

Other post-injury benefits include: 1) stabilizing and supporting joints after injuries to the muscle or ligament; 2) assisting and allowing the athlete to return to activity after minor injuries; 3) preventing and reducing further harm to injured area; 4) maintaining proper biomechanics during activity; 5) preventing neuromuscular damage; and 6) reducing force on the area during activity.

Disadvantages

Incorrect athletic taping may lead to blistering or future injuries.
After activity and motion begins, the stiffness of the tape reduces.
Physiological dependency on using tape
Expensive, especially when it is needed frequently

Techniques

There are set regulations and rules that govern the athletic taping techniques used by trainers and health professionals. There are a few aspects of athletic taping that are standardized.
Skin preparation: Removal of hair, cleaning of skin, addressing of any lesions with necessary consultation, using adherents and lubricants, underpads, etc.
Functional position of the body to be taped: The athlete's position depends on the area getting taped.
Body mechanics of the trainer/taper: The athlete must be at a comfortable height in order to reduce fatigue over long periods of taping time.
Athletic tape application: Athletic tape must be adhered to a dry and clean area of the body at body temperature to bare skin or pre-wrap in order to prevent slippage and to maintain the effectiveness and rigidity of the wrap. The type and width of the athletic tape must be appropriate (able to strap the given body part suitable) for the area being taped. Areas subject to high friction should be reinforced with protective padding or under-wrap. Athletic tape should be applied: film and wrinkle free; without impairment of circulation, nerves, or muscle movement; and without pressure on body prominences.
Removal: Removal of the athletic tape post athletic activity should be done with tape cutters (sometimes known as 'Sharks') or special tape scissors. The skin must be free of tape residue.

Alternatives
Wraps and braces can be used instead or with taping to stabilize the affected area. Braces might alter muscular activity, where tape might not.

Types of tape
Standard athletic tape is classified by the following characteristics:
Number of vertical (warp) and horizontal (woof) threads per square inch. These threads vary from 120 to 150 per square inch. A higher thread count is synonymous with a higher quality including higher tensile strength, better adhesive, easier removal, longer lasting, and more expensive.
Tensile strength
Composition: bleached versus unbleached cotton; cotton versus synthetic fibers versus a blend of both.
Rigid tape: provides a firm support, holds and reduces movement of a joint with a strong and sticky material, examples include Strappal or Endura Fix, etc.
Under tape: has a different type of fabric that allows more movement and air, examples include Hyperfix or Endura Fix, etc.
Elastic tape: flexible tape, that when it is applied, lets your skin breathe and transmit moisture through the type of material used, examples include Tensoplast and Elastikon, etc.
Felt tape: this type of tape does not have any glue in the material and is used a barrier to the skin Example: Mueller
Bandages: does not have glue in the material which allows them to stick to each other. Example: Coban
Kinesio: adjusts to skin and glides as you move, commonly used by athletes

See also

Buddy wrapping
Elastic bandage
Elastic therapeutic tape
Self-adhering bandage

References

https://web.archive.org/web/20171027025825/http://archive.randi.org/site/index.php/swift-blog/1791-kinesio-taping-the-latest-sports-fad.html

Athletic training
Medical treatments